Pseudo-Melitus (late 5th Century), or the Passion of John, "Passio Iohannis apostoli", is a Christian text belonging to the later New Testament Apocrypha.

References

Christian manuscripts
New Testament apocrypha
5th-century Christian texts